Vauxhall Airport  is located  south southeast of Vauxhall, Alberta, Canada.

References

External links
Place to Fly on COPA's Places to Fly airport directory

Registered aerodromes in Alberta
Municipal District of Taber